Rangers Football Club was founded in 1872 and is one of the 11 original members of the Scottish Football League in 1890. The club's home ground, Ibrox Stadium, is in the south-west of Glasgow, Scotland.

Rangers were the first British club to reach a UEFA tournament final and won the European Cup Winners' Cup in 1972 after being runner-up twice in 1961 and 1967. A third runners-up finish in Europe came in the UEFA Cup in 2008. A forth runners-up finish in Europe came in the Europa League in 2022

The table details the club's achievements in all national and European first team competitions and the top scorers for each season.

Overview
Although Rangers had been playing in the Scottish Cup since season 1874–75, being runners-up twice, they did not compete in an official league until 1890–91. In their very first season the club played eighteen championship matches, also a play-off which they drew and so shared the first ever league title with Dumbarton.

The Scottish League Cup did not begin until season 1946–47, Rangers won the inaugural competition by defeating Aberdeen 4–0 in the final. The 1956–57 season saw the club enter the European arena.

Key

Pld = Played
W = Games won
D = Games drawn
L = Games lost
GF = Goals for
GA = Goals against
Pts = Points
Pos = Final position
R1 = Round 1
R2 = Round 2
R3 = Round 3
R4 = Round 4
R5 = Round 5
R6 = Round 6
QF = Quarter-finals
SF = Semi-finals
n/a = not applicable

Colour coding

Seasons

Prior to league formation (1872–1890)

League football era, Pre-war (1890–1939)

Football during and after the Second World War (1940–1955)

European football era

† Rangers were deducted 10 points when the club entered administration.
* Season finished early due to COVID-19 pandemic.

Notes

External links
 Rangers Results: 1872–2006, Chic Sharp
 Soccerbase
 Fitbastats

Seasons
 
Rangers
Seasons